The Child Labor Amendment is a proposed and still-pending amendment to the United States Constitution that would specifically authorize Congress to regulate "labor of persons under eighteen years of age". The amendment was proposed on June 2, 1924, following Supreme Court rulings in 1918 and 1922 that federal laws regulating and taxing goods produced by employees under the ages of 14 and 16 were unconstitutional.

The majority of the state legislatures ratified the amendment by the mid-1930s; however, it has not been ratified by the requisite three-fourths of the states according to Article V of the Constitution and none has ratified it since 1937. Interest in the amendment waned following the passage of the Fair Labor Standards Act of 1938, which implemented federal regulation of child labor with the Supreme Court's approval in 1941.

The amendment was itself the subject of a 1939 Supreme Court decision, Coleman v. Miller (307 U.S. 433), regarding its putative expiration. As Congress did not set a time limit for its ratification, the amendment is still pending before the states. Ratification by an additional ten states would be necessary for this amendment to come into force.

Text

Background

With the Keating–Owen Act of 1916, the United States Congress had attempted to regulate interstate commerce involving goods produced by employees under the ages of 14 or 16, depending on the type of work. The Supreme Court found this law unconstitutional in Hammer v. Dagenhart (1918). Later that year, Congress attempted to levy a tax on businesses with employees under the ages of 14 or 16 (again depending on the type of work), which was struck down by the Supreme Court in Bailey v. Drexel Furniture (1922). It became apparent that a constitutional amendment would be necessary for such legislation to overcome the Court's objections.

Legislative history

The amendment was offered by Ohio Republican Congressman Israel Moore Foster on April 26, 1924, during the 68th Congress, in the form of House Joint Resolution No. 184.  

House Joint Resolution No. 184 was adopted by the United States House of Representatives on April 26, 1924, with a vote of 297 yeas, 69 nays, 2 absent and 64 not voting. It was then adopted by the Senate on June 2, 1924, with a vote of 61 yeas, 23 nays and 12 not voting. And with that, the proposed constitutional amendment was submitted to the state legislatures for ratification pursuant to Article V of the Constitution.

Ratification history

Having been approved by Congress, the proposed amendment was sent to the state legislatures for ratification and was ratified by the following states:
 Arkansas – June 28, 1924
 California – January 8, 1925
 Arizona – January 29, 1925
 Wisconsin – February 25, 1925
 Montana – February 11, 1927
 Colorado – April 28, 1931
 Oregon – January 31, 1933
 Washington – February 3, 1933
 North Dakota – March 4, 1933 (After State Senate rejection – January 28, 1925)
 Ohio – March 22, 1933
 Michigan – May 10, 1933
 New Hampshire – May 17, 1933 (After rejection – March 18, 1925)
 New Jersey – June 12, 1933
 Illinois – June 30, 1933
 Oklahoma – July 5, 1933
 Iowa – December 5, 1933 (After State House rejection – March 11, 1925)
 West Virginia – December 12, 1933
 Minnesota – December 14, 1933 (After rejection – April 14, 1925)
 Maine – December 16, 1933 (After rejection – April 10, 1925)
 Pennsylvania – December 21, 1933 (After rejection – April 16, 1925)
 Wyoming – January 31, 1935
 Utah – February 5, 1935 (After rejection – February 4, 1925)
 Idaho – February 7, 1935 (After State House rejection – February 7, 1925)
 Indiana – February 8, 1935 (After State Senate rejection – February 5, 1925 and State House rejection - March 5, 1925)
 Kentucky – January 13, 1937 (After rejection – March 24, 1926)
 Nevada – January 29, 1937
 New Mexico – February 12, 1937 (After rejection – 1935)
 Kansas – February 25, 1937 (After rejection – January 30, 1925) 

The following fifteen state legislatures rejected the Child Labor Amendment and did not subsequently ratify it:
 Connecticut - 1925
 Delaware - 1925
 Florida - 1925
 Georgia - 1924
 Louisiana - 1924
 Maryland - 1927
 Massachusetts - 1925
 Missouri - 1925
 North Carolina - 1924
 South Carolina - 1925
 South Dakota - 1925, 1933 and 1937
 Tennessee - 1925
 Texas - 1925
 Vermont - 1925
 Virginia - 1926
Although the act, on the part of state legislatures, of "rejecting" a proposed constitutional amendment has no legal recognition, such action does have political ramifications.

Of the 48 states in the Union in 1924, five have taken no action of record on the amendment: Alabama, Mississippi, Nebraska, New York and Rhode Island; neither have Alaska nor Hawaii, both of which became states in 1959.

On March 15, 2018, a concurrent resolution to belatedly ratify the Child Labor Amendment was officially introduced in the New York Assembly, the "lower" house of the New York Legislature.  It has thus far received no further consideration than to be referred to that chamber's Committee on Judiciary and reintroduction. In 2021, a concurrent resolution was introduced in the Rhode Island Senate to ratify the amendment but never made it out of committee. In 2023, a resolution was introduced in Nebraska Legislature to ratify the amendment.

In 2021 and 2022, a concurrent resolution to ratify the Child Labor Amendment passed in the Hawaii Senate with bipartisan support but stalled in the Hawaii House of Representatives.

Presently, there being 50 states in the Union, the amendment will remain inoperative unless it is ratified by an additional 10 states to reach the necessary threshold of 38 states.

Judicial history

Only five states adopted the amendment in the 1920s. Ten of the states initially balked, then re-examined their position during the 1930s and decided to ratify. These delayed decisions resulted in many controversies and resulted in the 1939 Supreme Court case Coleman v. Miller (307 U.S. 433) in which it was determined that the Child Labor Amendment remained pending before the state legislatures because the 68th Congress did not specify any deadline. The ruling also formed the basis of the unusual and belated ratification of the 27th Amendment which was proposed by Congress in 1789 and ratified more than two centuries later in 1992 by the legislatures of at least three-fourths of the 50 states.

The common legal opinion on federal child labor regulation reversed in the 1930s. Congress passed the Fair Labor Standards Act in 1938 regulating the employment of those under 16 or 18 years of age. The Supreme Court ruled unanimously in favor of that law in United States v. Darby Lumber Co. (1941), which overturned Hammer v. Dagenhart – one of the key decisions that had motivated the proponents of the Child Labor Amendment. After this shift, the amendment has been described as "moot" and lost the momentum that had once propelled it; hence, the movement for it has advanced no further.

If ever ratified by the required number of U.S. state legislatures, the Child Labor Amendment would repose in the Congress of the United States shared jurisdiction with the states to legislate on the subject of child labor.

Opposition

In 1933 J. Gresham Machen, who was a major voice at the time for Evangelical Fundamentalism and conservative politics, delivered a paper called Mountains and Why We Love Them, which was read before a group of ministers in Philadelphia on November 27, 1933. In passing he mentions the Child Labor Amendment and says "Will the so-called 'Child Labor Amendment' and other similar measures be adopted, to the destruction of all the decencies and privacies of the home?"

See also

 List of amendments to the United States Constitution, amendments sent to the states, both ratified and unratified
 List of proposed amendments to the United States Constitution, amendments proposed in Congress but never sent to the states for ratification

References

External links
The Child Labor Amendment Debate of the 1920s, Bill Kaufmann, Ludwig Von Mises Institute, November 1992
Labor: Children, a 1924 Time magazine article on the subject 
Labor: A 20th Amendment?, a 1925 Time magazine article discussing 1920s attempts to ratify the Amendment 

1924 in American law
1924 in American politics
Child labor in the United States
Children's rights in the United States
Unratified amendments to the United States Constitution
68th United States Congress
1924 documents